Irakli Labadze (born June 9, 1981) is a Georgian retired professional tennis player. His career-high singles ranking was World No. 42, which he attained in July 2004. He is the first Georgian player to reach the fourth round at Wimbledon as a qualifier.

Career

Juniors
Labadze had a successful junior career, notably reaching the final of the Wimbledon boys' singles in 1998 and losing to future World No.1 Roger Federer. Together with Lovro Zovko he won the 1999 French Open boys' doubles.

Pro tour
Labadze's most successful appearance at a Grand Slam event came at the 2006 Wimbledon Championships, where he reached the fourth round. After eliminating Gastón Gaudio and Mardy Fish, he was defeated by the eventual runner-up Rafael Nadal in three sets. It was to be his last appearance in the singles main draw at a major championship.

Labadze's best result in Masters 1000 tournaments was reaching the semifinals of the 2004 Indian Wells Masters. After defeating Carlos Moyá and James Blake, he lost to Tim Henman in straight sets.

Junior Grand Slam finals

Singles: 1 (1 runner-up)

Doubles: 1 (1 title)

ATP career finals

Doubles: 3 (3 runner-ups)

ATP Challenger and ITF Futures finals

Singles: 18 (10–8)

Doubles: 14 (6–8)

Performance timeline

Singles

External links
 
 
 

1981 births
Living people
French Open junior champions
Male tennis players from Georgia (country)
Sportspeople from Tbilisi
Grand Slam (tennis) champions in boys' doubles